Popular Socialist Party may refer to:

 Dominican Popular Socialist Party
 Popular Socialist Party (Argentina)
 Popular Socialist Party (Brazil)
 Popular Socialist Party (Chile)
 Popular Socialist Party (Cuba)
 Popular Socialist Party (Haiti)
 Popular Socialist Party (Mexico)
 Popular Socialist Party (Spain)
 Popular Socialist Party of Mexico
 Labour Popular Socialist Party, early 20th-century Russian party
 Lithuanian Popular Socialist Democratic Party

See also
 Socialist Party (disambiguation)